In enzymology, a myricetin O-methyltransferase is an enzyme that catalyzes the chemical reaction

2 S-adenosyl-L-methionine + myricetin  2 S-adenosyl-L-homocysteine + syringetin

Thus, the two substrates of this enzyme are S-adenosyl methionine and myricetin, whereas its two products are S-adenosylhomocysteine and syringetin.

This enzyme belongs to the family of transferases, specifically those transferring one-carbon group methyltransferases.  The systematic name of this enzyme class is S-adenosyl-L-methionine:myricetin O-methyltransferase.

References 

 

EC 2.1.1
Enzymes of unknown structure
Flavonols metabolism
O-methylated flavonoids metabolism